The Hsinchu County Council (HCC) is the elected county council of Hsinchu County, Republic of China. The council composes of 35 councilors lastly elected through the 2018 Republic of China local election on 24 November 2018.

History
The council was originally established on 14 April 1946 in Taoyuan at Wudedian Hall. It was then soon dissolved on 23 January 1951. The first members of the council was elected on 7 January 1951 and was shown on 23 January 1951. The temporary office for the council was at the east room of the Hsinchu County Government building (the present-day Hsinchu City Hall). On 28 October 1989, the county council moved from Hsinchu City to Zhubei City in Hsinchu County.

The 18th county council 

Since the local elections in 2014, the Council was composed as follows:

Current composition 

Since the local elections in 2018, the Council was composed as follows:

Organization

Administration
 Personnel Room
 Accounting Room
 Legal Affairs Room
 General Affairs Room
 Council Session Room
 Secretary

Reviewing board
 First Review Meeting
 Second Review Meeting
 Third Review Meeting
 Fourth Review Meeting
 Fifth Review Meeting
 Procedural Committee
 Disciplinary Committee
 Joint Review Board
 Task Force

See also
 Hsinchu County Government

References

External links

 

1946 establishments in Taiwan
County councils of Taiwan
Hsinchu County
Organizations established in 1946